The 2015–16 season is the club's 3rd season in the Scottish Premiership and their 6th consecutive season in the top flight. Inverness Caledonian Thistle will also compete in the League Cup, the Scottish Cup, and the Europa League.

Results and fixtures

Pre season / Friendlies

Scottish Premiership

UEFA Europa League

Scottish League Cup

Scottish Cup

Squad statistics

Appearances

|}

Overall Goalscorers

Disciplinary record

Team statistics

League table

Division summary

Management statistics
Last updated on 14 May 2016

Transfers

In

Out

See also
 List of Inverness Caledonian Thistle F.C. seasons

Notes

References

Inverness Caledonian Thistle
Inverness Caledonian Thistle F.C. seasons